Accidental incest is sexual activity or marriage between persons who were unaware of a family relationship between them which would be considered incestuous.

The laws of many jurisdictions void incestuous marriages, even if entered into without awareness of the kinship. If an incestuous relationship is suspected, DNA testing may be used. Some jurisdictions permit offspring of IVF donations access to donation records or to adoption records.

Causes
People may be unaware of a kinship relationship between them in a number of circumstances. For example, artificial insemination with an anonymous donated sperm may result in offspring being unaware of any biological relations, such as paternity or half siblings. To reduce the likelihood of accidental incest, fertility clinics usually limit the number of times that a donor's sperm may be used. Some countries have laws limiting the number of children a donor can father, while others limit sperm donations based on family numbers to enable one family to have true siblings.

Taiwan allows those conceived by artificial means to find out if they are related to a person they are considering marrying.

Accidental incest may also arise in the following situations:
 Children separated from their family at birth
 Child abandonment
 Sexual exploration
Genetic sexual attraction is a pseudoscientific explanation offered for cases of sexual attraction and relations between adults who were not aware of their close blood relations.

Notable cases
In 2008, during a debate on the Human Fertilisation and Embryology Act 2008 in the House of Lords, Lord Alton of Liverpool claimed that a British brother and sister, who were twins separated at birth, married without knowing of their relationship. According to Lord Alton, the relationship was discovered soon after their wedding, and the marriage annulled. The case was raised regarding whether adoptions should be kept secret. Questions were raised about whether the story is actually true, as Lord Alton was known to oppose the act due to its provision allowing the creation and use of animal-human hybrid stem cells for medical purposes.
An engaged couple in South Africa, who had been together for five years and were expecting a child, discovered that they were brother and sister just before their wedding. They were raised separately and met as adults in college. Just before the wedding, their parents met and they came to realize that they were siblings. The couple broke off the relationship after the discovery.

See also
Absalom, Absalom!
Andorra (play)
Mordred
Oedipus Rex
Westermarck effect
Yrsa

References 

Accidents
Incest
Sperm donation